Events in the year 1829 in Brazil.

Incumbents
 Monarch – Pedro I

Events

Births
 1 May - José de Alencar

Deaths

References

 
1820s in Brazil
Years of the 19th century in Brazil
Brazil
Brazil